The Gates of Eden is a lost 1916 silent film drama directed by John H. Collins and starring his wife Viola Dana. The Columbia Pictures Corporation, not related to the Hollywood studio, produced with release through Metro Pictures.

Cast
Viola Dana - Eve/Evelyn
Augustus Phillips - Joseph
Robert Walker - William Bard
Edward Earle - Rodney
Grace Stevens - Eldress Sarah (*as Grace E. Stevens)
Fred C. Jones - Huxley
Harry Linson - Shaker Brother
George D. Melville - Mr. Bard

References

External links

1916 films
American silent feature films
Lost American films
1916 drama films
Silent American drama films
American black-and-white films
Metro Pictures films
Films directed by John H. Collins
1910s American films